The Romer-Simpson Medal is the highest award issued by the Society of Vertebrate Paleontology for "sustained and outstanding scholarly excellence and service to the discipline of vertebrate paleontology". The award is named in honor of Alfred S. Romer and George G. Simpson.

Past awards 
Source: Society for Vertebrate Paleontology

1987 Everett C. Olson
1988 Bobb Schaeffer
1989 Edwin H. Colbert
1990 Richard Estes
1991 no award
1992 Loris S. Russell
1993 Zhou Mingzhen
1994 John H. Ostrom
1995 Zofia Kielan-Jaworowska
1996 Percy Butler
1997 Colin Patterson
1998 Albert E. Wood
1999 Robert Warren Wilson
2000 John A. Wilson
2001 Malcolm McKenna
2002 Mary R. Dawson
2003 Rainer Zangerl
2004 Robert L. Carroll
2005 Donald E. Russell
2006 William A. Clemens
2007 Wann Langston, Jr.
2008 Jose Bonaparte
2009 Farish Jenkins
2010 Rinchen Barsbold
2011 Alfred W. Crompton
2012 Philip D. Gingerich
2013 Jack Horner
2014 Hans-Peter Schultze
2015 Jim Hopson
2016 Mee-mann Chang
2017 Philip J. Currie
2018 Kay Behrensmeyer
2019 Michael Archer
2020 Jenny Clack
2021 Blaire Van Valkenburgh

See also
 List of biology awards
 List of paleontology awards

References 

Paleontology awards
Awards established in 1987
American awards